Hartwell is the northernmost neighborhood in Cincinnati, Ohio, centered roughly on the intersections of I-75 and Ronald Reagan Cross County Highway. Its boundaries are a combination of Caldwell Park and Ronald Reagan Cross County Highway to the south, I-75 to the east, and a combination of Millsdale Street and Compton Road to the North. The population was 5,806 at the 2020 census.

History
Hartwell was platted in 1868 by the Hamilton County Building Association. It was named for John W. Hartwell, who was vice president of the Cincinnati, Hamilton and Dayton Railway when the station was located.

Hartwell was incorporated as a village in 1876. In 1912, the village was annexed by the City of Cincinnati.

References

Neighborhoods in Cincinnati
Former municipalities in Ohio